Notechidnopsis is a group of plants in the family Apocynaceae first described as a genus in 1985. It contains only one recognized species, Notechidnopsis tessellata, native to Cape Province in South Africa.

formerly included
moved to Riocreuxia 
Notechidnopsis columnaris (Nel) Lavranos & Bleck synonym of  Riocreuxia torulosa Decne.

Taxonomy
Phylogenetic studies have shown this genus to most closely related to the stapeliad genera Richtersveldtia and Larryleachia. Marginally more distantly related is a sister branch of related genera including Lavrania and Hoodia.

References

Monotypic Apocynaceae genera
Flora of South Africa
Asclepiadoideae